Pilbara octava is a species of fly in the family Dolichopodidae from Australia, and the only member of the genus Pilbara. The genus is named after the Pilbara region of Western Australia, where P. octava was found. In particular, the only known location of P. octava is at Millstream, Fortescue River.

References 

Sciapodinae
Diptera of Australasia
Insects of Australia
Insects described in 1994
Arthropods of Western Australia